Serui Kota (Seroei) is a city and capital of Yapen Islands Regency of Papua, Indonesia. As of 2021, the city has a population of 13,568. It is located on the island of Yapen.

References

Yapen Islands
Cities in Indonesia
Populated coastal places in Indonesia
Regency seats of Papua (province)
Populated places in Papua (province)